is a passenger railway station in located in the city of Tsu, Mie Prefecture, Japan, operated by Central Japan Railway Company (JR Tōkai).

Lines
Ise-Kawaguchi Station is served by the Meishō Line, and is 21.3 rail kilometers from the terminus of the line at Matsusaka Station.

Station layout
The station consists of a single side platform serving one bi-directional track. There is no station building, but only a rain shelter on the platform. The station is unattended.

Platforms

Adjacent stations

History 
Ise-Kawaguchi Station was opened on November 27, 1925, as a station on the privately owned Nakaise Railway. On September 11, 1931, the Japanese Government Railways (JGR) (which became the Japan National Railways (JNR) after World War II) connected to the station. The Nakaise Railway ceased operations from February 1, 1943. Freight operations were discontinued in October 1965. Along with the division and privatization of JNR on April 1, 1987, the station came under the control and operation of the Central Japan Railway Company.

Passenger statistics
In fiscal 2019, the station was used by an average of 11 passengers daily (boarding passengers only).

Surrounding area
Tsu Municipal Kawaguchi Elementary School
 Sakakibara Onsen

See also
 List of railway stations in Japan

References

External links

JR Central home page

Railway stations in Japan opened in 1925
Railway stations in Mie Prefecture
Tsu, Mie